The 2006–07 season was the 108th season of competitive league football in the history of English football club Wolverhampton Wanderers. They played the season in the second tier of the English football system, the Football League Championship.

Season summary
The season was the first under new manager Mick McCarthy who replaced Glenn Hoddle after the latter resigned suddenly in July 2006. McCarthy's appointment coincided with a new approach by the club after their parachute payments stemming from their Premier League relegation two years earlier ceased. After numerous senior players departed under these new financial conditions, a fresh ethos of recruiting younger players from lower league sides emerged.

The team finished fifth, qualifying for the play-offs. Their promotion hopes were ended by local rivals West Bromwich Albion - whom they met a record five times during the campaign - who beat them in both legs of the play-off semi finals to win 4–2 on aggregate.

Results

Pre season

Football League Championship

A total of 24 teams competed in the Championship during the 2006–07 season. Each team would play every other team twice, once at their stadium, and once at the opposition's. Three points were awarded to teams for each win, one point per draw, and none for defeats. The provisional fixture list was released on 22 June 2006, but was subject to change in the event of matches being selected for television coverage or police concerns.

Final table

Results summary

Results by round

Play-offs

FA Cup

League Cup

Players

Statistics

|-
|align="left"|||align="left"|||align="left"|  
|0||0||0||0||0||0||0||0||0||0||
|-
|align="left"|||align="left"|||align="left"|  †
|||0||0||0||0||0||||0||0||0||
|-
|align="left"|||align="left"|||align="left"|  †
|||0||0||0||0||0||||0||0||0||
|-
|align="left"|||align="left"|||style="background:#faecc8" align="left"|  ‡ 
|||2||3||0||0||0||style="background:#98FB98"|||2||3||0||
|-
|align="left"|||align="left"|||align="left"| 
|||9||3||1||1||0||||10||7||0||
|-
|align="left"|||align="left"|||align="left"| 
|42||1||3||0||0||0||style="background:#98FB98"|45||1||7||2||
|-
|align="left"|||align="left"|||align="left"|  (c)
|||5||0||0||1||0||||5||4||0||
|-
|align="left"|||align="left"|||align="left"| 
|21||0||2||0||0||0||23||0||5||2||
|-
|align="left"|||align="left"|||align="left"| 
|34||3||3||0||||0||style="background:#98FB98"|||3||6||0||
|-
|align="left"|||align="left"|FW||align="left"| 
|||0||0||0||0||0||||0||0||1||
|-
|align="left"|10||align="left"|FW||align="left"|  
|||9||0||0||0||0||style="background:#98FB98"|||9||4||0||
|-
|align="left"|11||align="left"|||align="left"| 
|||0||1||0||1||0||style="background:#98FB98"|||0||2||0||
|-
|align="left"|12||align="left"|||align="left"|  
|||0||||0||1||0||||0||6||0||
|-
|align="left"|13||align="left"|FW||align="left"|  ¤
|||3||||0||||0||style="background:#98FB98"|||3||2||0||
|-
|align="left"|14||align="left"|||style="background:#faecc8" align="left"|  ‡ 
|||0||3||1||1||0||style="background:#98FB98"|||1||7||0||
|-
|align="left"|15||align="left"|||align="left"|  ¤
|0||0||0||0||1||0||1||0||0||0||
|-
|align="left"|16||align="left"|||align="left"| 
|||0||||0||0||0||||0||0||0||
|-
|align="left"|17||align="left"|FW||align="left"|  †
|||5||0||0||||0||||5||2||0||
|-
|align="left"|17||align="left"|FW||align="left"| 
|||3||||0||0||0||style="background:#98FB98"|||3||0||0||
|-
|align="left"|18||align="left"|FW||style="background:#faecc8" align="left"|  ‡  
|||0||3||2||1||0||style="background:#98FB98"|||2||0||0||
|-
|align="left"|19||align="left"|||style="background:#faecc8" align="left"|  ‡ 
|0||0||0||0||0||0||0||0||0||0||
|-
|align="left"|20||align="left"|||align="left"|  
|44||0||3||0||0||0||47||0||0||0||
|-
|align="left"|21||align="left"|FW||align="left"|  ¤
|0||0||0||0||1||0||1||0||0||0||
|-
|align="left"|22||align="left"|||align="left"|  
|||2||0||0||0||0||||2||0||0||
|-
|align="left"|23||align="left"|||align="left"|  ¤
|0||0||0||0||0||0||0||0||0||0||
|-
|align="left"|24||align="left"|||align="left"|  † 
|0||0||0||0||0||0||0||0||0||0||
|-
|align="left"|25||align="left"|||align="left"| 
|||0||0||0||0||0||||0||1||0||
|-
|align="left"|26||align="left"|||align="left"|  
|||0||3||0||1||0||style="background:#98FB98"|||0||4||1||
|-
|align="left"|27||align="left"|||align="left"|  
|||0||0||0||0||0||style="background:#98FB98"|||0||0||0||
|-
|align="left"|28||align="left"|||align="left"|  ¤ 
|||0||3||0||1||0||||0||2||0||
|-
|align="left"|29||align="left"|||align="left"|  
|||0||0||0||0||0||style="background:#98FB98"|||0||0||0||
|-
|align="left"|30||align="left"|||align="left"| 
|||0||0||0||1||0||||0||0||0||
|-
|align="left"|31||align="left"|||align="left"|  ¤
|||0||0||0||0||0||style="background:#98FB98"|||0||0||0||
|-
|align="left"|32||align="left"|||style="background:#faecc8" align="left"|  ‡ 
|||0||0||0||0||0||style="background:#98FB98"|||0||0||0||
|-
|align="left"|32||align="left"|||style="background:#faecc8" align="left"|  ‡ 
|||3||3||0||0||0||style="background:#98FB98"|||3||1||0||
|-
|align="left"|33||align="left"|||align="left"|   
|0||0||0||0||0||0||0||0||0||0||
|-
|align="left"|34||align="left"|||align="left"|  ¤ 
|||0||0||0||0||0||style="background:#98FB98"|||0||0||0||
|-
|align="left"|35||align="left"|||align="left"| 
|0||0||0||0||0||0||0||0||0||0||
|-
|align="left"|36||align="left"|||align="left"|  
|0||0||0||0||0||0||0||0||0||0||
|-
|align="left"|37||align="left"|||align="left"|  †  
|0||0||0||0||0||0||0||0||0||0||
|-
|align="left"|37||align="left"|||style="background:#faecc8" align="left"|  ‡ 
|26||8||0||0||0||0||style="background:#98FB98"|26||8||4||0||
|-
|align="left"|38||align="left"|||style="background:#faecc8" align="left"|  ‡  
|||0||0||0||0||0||style="background:#98FB98"|||0||0||0||
|-
|align="left"|39||align="left"|FW||align="left"| 
|19||5||0||0||0||0||style="background:#98FB98"|19||5||2||0||
|-
|align="left"|40||align="left"|||style="background:#faecc8" align="left"|  ‡ 
|||0||0||0||0||0||style="background:#98FB98"|||0||0||0||
|}

Awards

Transfers

In

Out

Loans in

Loans out

Kit
The season saw new home and away kits, both manufactured by Le Coq Sportif. The away kit was an all-white design. Chaucer Consulting sponsored the club for a third season.

References

Wolverhampton Wanderers
Wolverhampton Wanderers F.C. seasons